Martín Nicolás Cháves García (born 12 May 1998) is a Uruguayan professional footballer who plays as an attacking midfielder for Churchill Brothers in the I-League.

Club career
Cháves started his youth career in his hometown of Colonia del Sacramento with Nacional de Colonia and Juventud Colonia. He soon moved to Montevideo where he joined the academy of Uruguay's most successful club; Peñarol. He failed to break into Peñarol's senior team and joined Brazilian club Grêmio on loan in 2017, where he was assigned to their reserve team.

Uruguayan Primera División club Juventud announced the signing of Cháves on a permanent deal in January 2019, however he didn't receive any game time with their senior team in both the Torneo Apertura and the Torneo Intermedio.

On 29 August 2019, Cháves penned a one-year deal with Indian Super League side NorthEast United.

On 31 July 2021, Cháves joined Greek second division club Rodos.

Rajasthan United 
In August 2022, Cháves returned to India and signed with I-League club Rajasthan United on a one-year deal. On 25 August, he made his debut for the club against East Bengal in the Durand Cup, which ended in a 0–0 stalemate. He came on as a 73rd-minute substitute for Lalremsanga.

In November 2022, he helped his team to reach the final of the Baji Rout Cup in Odisha. They later clinched the title defeating Churchill Brothers. On 12 January 2023, Rajasthan United confirmed that they have parted ways with Cháves. The club stated he returned to Uruguay citing personal reasons in a bid to be close to his family, which has now been deleted.

Churchill Brothers 
On 16 January 2023, Cháves put pen to paper on a deal until the end of the season.

International career
Cháves is a former Uruguay youth international and represented his nation at the 2015 South American U-17 Championship. He made his tournament debut on the 15th of March 2015 in a 1–0 win against Ecuador. He played one more match in the tournament, and his side eventually finished fifth.

Career statistics

Club

Honours
Rajasthan United
Baji Rout Cup: 2022

References

1998 births
Living people
Uruguayan footballers
Association football forwards
NorthEast United FC players
Rodos F.C. players
Indian Super League players
Uruguay youth international footballers
Uruguayan expatriate footballers
Expatriate footballers in India
Expatriate footballers in Greece
Uruguayan expatriate sportspeople in India
Uruguayan expatriate sportspeople in Greece
Rajasthan United FC players